David Nandi Odhiambo (born June 24, 1965), also known as D. Nandi Odhiambo is an African-Canadian novelist and writer of Luo and Luhya descent. He was born in Nairobi, Kenya, and moved to Winnipeg, Manitoba, Canada, in 1977. He has a PhD in English Literature from the University of Hawaiʻi at Mānoa, an MFA in creative writing from the University of Massachusetts Amherst, and a B.A. in classics from McGill University. In 2019 he was one of two recipients of the Elliot Cades Award for Literature, considered among the most prestigious literary honors bestowed in Hawaiʻi. As of fall 2019, he is an associate professor of English at the University of Hawaiʻi – West Oʻahu.

Odhiambo has published four novels: diss/ed banded nation in 1998, Kipligat's Chance in 2003, and The Reverend's Apprentice, Volume I in 2008, and Smells like Stars in 2018.

References

Revival:an anthology of Black Canadian Writing, 2006 (McClelland & Stewart)
Bluesprint: Black British Columbian literature and orature, 2002 (Arsenal Pulp Press)
Encyclopedia of Literature in Canada'', 2002 (University of Toronto Press)
African Canadian Online, York University
Penguin Books Author page,
Canadian Literature: A Quarterly of Criticism and Review, 
BC BookWorld biography of David N. Odhiambo

1965 births
Living people
20th-century Canadian male writers
20th-century Canadian novelists
21st-century Canadian male writers
21st-century Canadian novelists
Canadian male novelists
Kenyan emigrants to Canada
Black Canadian writers
Writers from Hawaii
University of Hawaiʻi at Mānoa alumni
University of Massachusetts Amherst alumni
McGill University alumni